Sandalus is a genus of cicada parasite beetles in the family Rhipiceridae.

Species

 Sandalus atricolor Picco, 1916
 Sandalus attenuatus (Laporte, 1834)
 Sandalus bowkeri Péringuey, 1888
 Sandalus capensis (Guérin-Méneville, 1843)
 Sandalus castanescens Fairmaire, 1897
 Sandalus costipennis Boheman, 1851
 Sandalus cribricollis Van Dyke, 1923
 Sandalus distinctus Péringuey, 1888
 Sandalus goryi (Laporte, 1834)
 Sandalus insuleatus Pic, 1923
 Sandalus kani Sakai & Sakai, 1981
 Sandalus marginatus Péringuey, 1888
 Sandalus mystacinus (Fabricius, 1794)
 Sandalus nebulosus (Guérin-Méneville, 1843)
 Sandalus niger Knoch, 1801
 Sandalus petrophya Knoch, 1801
 Sandalus porosus LeConte, 1868
 Sandalus proximus Péringuey, 1888
 Sandalus punctulatus Boheman, 1851
 Sandalus randyi Schnepp & Powell, 2018
 Sandalus sauteri Emden, 1924
 Sandalus segnis Lewis, 1887
 Sandalus subelongatus Picco, 1907
 Sandalus taiwanicus Lee, Satô & Sakai, 2005

References

Further reading

External links

 

Elateriformia
Articles created by Qbugbot